MAP/microtubule affinity-regulating kinase 3 is an enzyme that in humans is encoded by the MARK3 gene.

Interactions 

MARK3 has been shown to interact with Stratifin.

It has been linked to a form of genetic blindness, believed to be a genetic recessive  disease that progressively destroys the eyes.

References

Further reading 

 
 
 
 
 
 
 
 
 
 
 
 
 
 
 
 

EC 2.7.11